HD 211073 is a triple star system in the northern constellation Lacerta, located around 580 light years from the Sun. It is visible to the naked eye as a faint orange-hued star with a baseline apparent visual magnitude of 4.50. The system is moving closer to the Earth with a heliocentric radial velocity of −11.7 km/s.

The primary member, designated component Aa, is an evolved giant star with a stellar classification of K2.5 III that is most likely (98% chance) on the horizontal branch. It is a suspected variable star that ranges in magnitude from 4.49 down to 4.55. This star is around a billion years old with 2.2 times the mass of the Sun and has expanded to 46 times the Sun's radius. It is radiating about 574 times the Sun's luminosity from its enlarged photosphere at an effective temperature of 4,180 K.

As of 2005, the inner pair of stars (Aa + Ab) in this system had an angular separation of  along a position angle (PA) of 170°. As of 2015, the magnitude 10.60 visual companion, designated component B, was separated from the primary by  along a PA of 190°.

References

K-type giants
Horizontal-branch stars
Suspected variables
Triple star systems
Lacerta (constellation)
Durchmusterung objects
211073
109754
8485